Usha C. V. Haley is an American author and academic, currently W. Frank Barton Distinguished Chair of International Business and Professor of Management at the W. Frank Barton School of Business at Wichita State University in the U.S. state of Kansas.  She is also Director of the Center for International Business Advancement at Wichita State University and elected Chair of the independent World Trade Council of Wichita. Prior to this, she was at other universities including West Virginia University, Massey University in New Zealand and at Harvard Kennedy School, Harvard University. Haley is credited with providing the intellectual foundations on understanding subsidies to Chinese industry with her book of the same name and testimonies, used as a basis for the current trade wars. See http://ushahaley.academia.edu. Born in Mumbai, India, she received a bachelor's degree in Politics at Elphinstone College, Mumbai and then went on to get graduate degrees from various American universities including a Master's from University of Illinois at Urbana–Champaign in Political Science, and New York University, where she received Master's and PhD degrees in International Business and Strategy from the Stern School of Business. Besides the US, Dr. Haley has lived and worked in Mexico, Singapore, Australia, China, India, Vietnam, Thailand, Italy, Finland, Russia, New Zealand and several other countries.

Research
An expert on Asian and Emerging Markets, Dr. Haley's extensive research includes over 350 articles and presentations and 8 books that explore companies and business environments in India, China, Southeast Asia and Mexico as well as the societal impacts of business schools and their research. Her research on Subsidies to Chinese Industry has supported trade regulation in the United States and the European Union. She has also studied the effects of sanctions and trade barriers such as subsidies on the behaviors of companies and nations. Her research on boycotts, divestitures and regulations published in Multinational Corporations in Political Environments concluded that most sanctions had no effect on US corporate behaviors in South Africa. Her book, The Chinese Tao of Business highlighted the Chinese business environment and how companies operate there to enhance their profits. Her book New Asian Emperors analyzed business information for strategic decisions in Southeast Asia and the influence of networks. Her latest book is Impact and the Management Researcher which looks at how scholarly research is valued in academia and by society.

She is a frequent public speaker and expert on the talk and press circuit. Her research has been regularly profiled in the major media including the Wall Street Journal, ("U.S. Researcher Usha C.V. Haley's Study on Chinese Subsidies to its Glass Industry", Aug 30, 2010) The Economist ("Survey of Asian Business", April 7–13, 2001), CNN ("Special Report: Eye on China," May 18–19, 2005), Bloomberg News ("China Steel Makers get $27 Billion Subsidy," January 8, 2008), Barron's Magazine ("Foreign Carmakers keep up the Pressure on Detroit," October 22, 2001), USA Today ("Tech Start-Ups Don't Grow on Trees Outside USA", June 28, 2006) the Wall Street Journal ("Could the Asian Crises Repeat?", July 3, 2007), The New York Times, ("With New Urgency US and South Korea Seek Free Trade Deal", January 16, 2007)  and BusinessWeek  ("The Art of Chinese Relationships", January 6, 2006).

Activities
In August 2012, Usha Haley received the Academy of Management's Practice Impact Award for influential research with impact. The Academy of Management is the largest and oldest scholarly association in Management in the world.  In September 2011, Usha Haley delivered a Thought Leader presentation on business and government relations in China at the Economist's flagship High Growth Market Summit in London. Dr. Haley has received a life-time award from academic publisher Emerald for her contributions to the understanding of Business in the Asia-Pacific and serves on several corporate and governmental boards as well as academic journal editorial boards.

Haley has also testified numerous times before US Congress on her research on China, subsidies, emerging and transitional economies.  Included in these testimonies, in July 2013 Haley served as witness in the United States Senate hearing on Smithfield and beyond: Examining foreign purchases of American food companies. Citing food-safety violations, senior managers' connections to the Chinese Communist Party, Chinese government competitive stances, Chinese subsidies and research on Chinese strategy, Haley advocated against the takeover of Virginia-based Smithfield Foods by Chinese company Shuanghui on national-security grounds. In April 2006 she testified before the US-China Economic and Security Review Commission on the effects of Chinese government subsidies on US business operations in China. In March 2007, she testified before the United States House Committee on Ways and Means in support of the ground-breaking, US federal trade legislation, The Nonmarket Economy Trade Remedy Act of 2007. She has also presented her research on China before the U.S. International Trade Commission, the United States Trade Representative and the United States Department of Commerce.

Dr. Haley's research on Chinese subsidies to its domestic industry and China's business environment has provided support for US federal investigations and legislation on emerging markets as well as in anti-dumping litigation in the European Union and the USA. Her work on Chinese steel subsidies has been used in trade regulation in the European Union and Germany.

Responding to her research findings and to other testimony from business, on June 20, 2008, U.S. steel pipe manufacturers, who have been battling a surge in imports from China, won a major victory when the International Trade Commission cleared the way for the imposition of stiff penalty tariffs for the next five years. The commission voted 5-0 that the U.S. industry was being harmed by the import of circular steel pipe from China. The decision marked the first time a U.S. industry has won a decision to impose tariffs on a Chinese product based on the argument that the Chinese government was unfairly subsidizing a Chinese industry. The ruling means penalty tariffs ranging from 99 percent to 701 percent will be imposed on Chinese imports of circular welded pipe. For more than two decades, the U.S. government had refused to consider subsidy cases against the Chinese government because China was classified as a non-market economy.  However, the Bush administration, facing increasing anger over soaring trade deficits with China, reversed course in late 2007 and announced it would treat China in the same way as other countries in disputes involving government subsidies ("US Steel Industry Wins Trade Case against China", Associated Press, June 20, 2008).

In October 2009, at the request of 8 U.S. senators from Pennsylvania, New York, Indiana, Michigan, Ohio and Louisiana, her research on subsidies to China's industry was used by the US government to question Chinese trade and production practices in the US-China Joint Commission on Commerce and Trade (JCCT), th major venue for business and trade negotiations between the two countries. In addition to Senator Casey, the letter requesting the inclusion of her research in the US-China negotiations was also signed by Senator Charles Schumer (NY), Senator Kirsten Gillibrand (NY), Senator Arlen Specter (PA), Senator Sherrod Brown (OH), Senator Debbie Stabenow (MI), Senator Evan Bayh (IN) and Senator Mary Landrieu (LA).

In July 2010, drawing on her research on China's paper industry, 104 U.S. senators and Representatives wrote a bi-partisan letter to President Obama recommending action on China trade.

In January 2012, her research on subsidies to Chinese auto parts became part of a congressional effort to demand an inquiry into Chinese auto-parts production and effects on US jobs.  The bi-partisan effort is led by Senator Sherrod Brown (Ohio), Senator Debbie Stabenow (Michigan), industry groups and think tanks.

In 2012, her research on the evolution of the global energy industry has supported the Obama administration's and industry groups' successful levying of tariffs on Chinese solar panel imports into the USA.

In the last decade, her research has been incorporated in over 40 pieces of trade regulation in the USA, Europe and Asia

Books
New Asian Emperors: The Overseas Chinese, their Strategies and Competitive Advantages (Butterworth-Heineman, 1998)
Strategic Management in the Asia Pacific: Harnessing Regional and Organizational Change for Competitive Advantage (Butterworth-Heinemann, 2000) 
Multinational Corporations in Political Environments: Ethics, Values and Strategies (World Scientific, 2001, 2004)
Asian Post-crisis Management: Corporate and Governmental Strategies for Sustainable Competitive Advantage (Palgrave, 2002)
The Chinese Tao of Business: The Logic of Successful Business Strategy (John Wiley & Sons, 2004, 2006)
New Asian Emperors: The Business Strategies of the Overseas Chinese (John Wiley & Sons, 2009)
Subsidies to Chinese Industry: State Capitalism, Business Strategy and Trade Policy (Oxford University Press, 2012)
 Impact and the Management Researcher (Routledge, 2021)

Articles
Subsidies and the China Price, Harvard Business Review, June 2008
 Government Strategy and Firm Policy in the Solar Photovoltaic Industry, California Management Review, November 2011
Storytelling the Internationalization of the Multinational Enterprise, Journal of International Business Studies, December 2014

Interviews
An Interview with Usha Haley, Thought Leadership Interview in Management, Emerald Management First and Emerald Management Thinking

Thought Leader Interview, Bloomberg BNA, June 2013

An Interview with Usha Haley, “Broadening the Impact of Management Research”, AACSB Insights, September 6, 2021

References

External links
Usha Haley CV and publications
CIBA-WTCouncil
Usha Haley recent media coverage
ChinaSubsidies.com
ChineseTao.com
NewAsianEmperors.com

Year of birth missing (living people)
Living people
American women writers of Indian descent
American Hindus
New York University Stern School of Business alumni
Harvard Kennedy School faculty
Indian emigrants to the United States
Elphinstone College alumni
University of Illinois Urbana-Champaign alumni
University of Wisconsin–Madison alumni
21st-century American women